The 1995 London Monarchs season was the third season for the franchise in the World League of American Football (WLAF). The team was led by head coach Bobby Hammond in his first year, and played its home games at White Hart Lane in London, England. They finished the regular season in fourth place with a record of four wins and six losses.

During the season, in early May 1995 London signed ex-New York Jets linebacker Dean Lytle from the WLAF's Frankfurt Galaxy.

Offseason

NFL allocations

Personnel
In October 1994 the Monarchs appointed Bobby Hammond, ex-player and Philadelphia assistant, as their head coach.

Staff

Roster

Schedule

Standings

Game summaries

Week 1: at Frankfurt Galaxy

Week 2: at Rhein Fire

Week 3: vs Amsterdam Admirals

Week 4: vs Barcelona Dragons

Week 5: at Scottish Claymores

Week 6: vs Frankfurt Galaxy

Week 7: at Barcelona Dragons

Week 8: vs Rhein Fire

Week 9: at Amsterdam Admirals

Week 10: vs Scottish Claymores

Notes

References

London Monarchs seasons